The men's 100 metre breaststroke event at the 2010 Asian Games took place on 15 November 2010 at Guangzhou Aoti Aquatics Centre.

There were 30 competitors from 23 countries who took part in this event. Four heats were held, with most containing the maximum number of swimmers (eight). The heat in which a swimmer competed did not formally matter for advancement, as the swimmers with the top eight times from the entire field qualified for the finals.

Ryo Tateishi from Japan won the gold medal, Asian record holder Kosuke Kitajima only finished with fourth place.

Schedule
All times are China Standard Time (UTC+08:00)

Records

Results 
Legend
DNS — Did not start

Heats

Final

References
 16th Asian Games Results

External links 
 Men's 100m Breaststroke Heats Official Website
 Men's 100m Breaststroke Ev.No.16 Final Official Website

Swimming at the 2010 Asian Games